The Reform War, or War of Reform, also known as the Three Years' War, was a civil war in Mexico lasting from January 11, 1858 to January 11, 1861, fought between liberals and conservatives, over the promulgation of Constitution of 1857, which had been drafted and published under the presidency of Ignacio Comonfort. The constitution had codified a liberal program intended to limit the political, economic, and cultural power of the Catholic Church; separate church and state; reduce the power of the Mexican Army by elimination of the fuero; strengthen the secular state through public education; and economically develop the nation.

The constitution had been promulgated on February 5, 1857 with the intention of coming into power on September 16, only to be confronted with extreme opposition from Conservatives and the Catholic Church over its anti-clerical provisions, most notably the Lerdo law, which forced the sale of most of the Church's rural properties. The measure was not exclusively aimed at the Catholic Church, but also Mexico's indigenous peoples, which were forced to sell sizeable portions of their communal lands. Controversy was further inflamed when the Catholic Church decreed excommunication to civil servants who took a government mandated oath upholding the new constitution, which left Catholic civil servants with the choice of keeping their jobs or being excommunicated.

As opposition to the constitution escalated, President Comonfort, a known moderate, joined conservative Félix Zuloaga's Plan of Tacubaya which amounted to a self-coup on December 17, 1857. The Constitutional Congress was closed, the constitution was nullified, and Comonfort gained emergency powers as President. Comonfort, hoping to establish a more moderate government however, found himself triggering a civil war and began to back away from Zuloaga. On January 11, 1858, Comonfort resigned and was constitutionally succeeded by president of the Supreme Court, Benito Juárez. Mexican states subsequently chose to side with either the Mexico City based government of Zuloaga or that of Juárez which established itself at the strategic port of Veracruz. The first year of the war was marked by repeated conservative victories, but the liberals remained entrenched in the nation's coastal regions, including their capital at Veracruz giving them access to vital customs revenue. 

Both governments attained international recognition, the Liberals by the United States, and the Conservatives by France, Great Britain, and Spain. Liberals negotiated the McLane–Ocampo Treaty with the United States in 1859. If ratified the treaty would have given the liberal regime cash but also would have granted the United States perpetual military and economic rights on Mexican territory. The treaty failed to pass in the U.S. Senate, but the U.S. Navy nonetheless helped protect Juárez's government in Veracruz.

Liberals thereafter accumulated victories on the battlefield until Conservative forces surrendered on December 22, 1860. Juárez returned to Mexico City on January 11, 1861 and held presidential elections in March. Although Conservative forces lost the war, guerrillas remained active in the countryside and would join the upcoming French intervention to help establish the Second Mexican Empire.

Background

After achieving independence in 1821, Mexico would alternatively find itself governed by both liberal and conservative coalitions. The original Constitution of 1824 established the federalist system championed by the liberals, with Mexican states holding sovereign power and the central government being weak. The brief liberal administration of Valentín Gómez Farías attempted to implement anti-clerical measures as early as 1833. The government closed church schools, assumed the right to make clerical appointments to the Catholic Church, and shut down monasteries. The ensuing backlash would result in Gómez Farías's government being overthrown and conservatives established a Centralist Republic in 1835 that lasted until the outbreak of the Mexican–American War in 1846.

In 1854 there was a liberal revolt, known as the Plan of Ayutla against the dictatorship of Santa Anna. A coalition of liberals, including Benito Juárez, then governor of Oaxaca, and Melchor Ocampo of Michoacán overthrew Santa Anna, and the presidency passed on to the liberal caudillo Juan Alvarez.

La Reforma

[[File:Alegoría de la Constitución de 1857.jpg|right|thumbnail|Allegory of the Constitution of 1857, Petronilo Monroy, 1869.]]
Juan Alvarez assumed power in November, 1855. His cabinet was radical and included the prominent liberals Benito Juárez, Miguel Lerdo de Tejada, Melchor Ocampo, and Guillermo Prieto, but also the more moderate Ignacio Comonfort.

Clashes in the cabinet led to the resignation of the radical Ocampo, but the administration was still determined to pass significant reforms. On November 23, 1855, the Juárez Law, named after the Minister of Justice, substantially reduced the jurisdiction of military and ecclesiastical courts which existed for soldiers and clergy.

Further dissension within liberal ranks led to Alvarez's resignation and the more moderate Comonfort becoming president on December 11, who chose a new cabinet. A constituent congress began meeting on February 14, 1856 and ratified the Juárez law. In June, another major controversy emerged over the promulgation of the Lerdo law, named after the secretary of the treasury, Miguel Lerdo de Tejada. The law aimed at disentailing the collective ownership of real estate by the Roman Catholic Church and indigenous communities. It forced 'civil or ecclesiastical institutions' to sell any land that they owned, with the tenants receiving priority and generous terms for purchasing the community-held land they cultivated. The law sought to undermine the economic power of the Church and to force create a class of yeoman farmers of indigenous community members. The law was envisioned as a way to develop Mexico's economy by increasing the number of indigenous private property owners, but in practice the land was bought up by rich speculators. Most of the lost indigenous lands community lands increased the size of large landed estates, haciendas.

The Constitution of 1857 was promulgated on February 5, 1857 and it integrated both the Juárez and the Lerdo laws. It was meant to take into effect on September 16. On March 17 it was decreed that all civil servants had to publicly swear and sign and oath to it. The Catholic Church decreed excommunication for anyone that took the oath, and subsequently many Catholics in the Mexican government lost their jobs for refusing the oath.

Controversy over the constitution continued to rage, and Comonfort himself was rumored to be conspiring to form a new government. On December 17, 1857 General Félix Zuloaga proclaimed the Plan of Tacubaya, declaring the Constitution of 1857 nullified, and offered supreme power to President Comonfort, who was to convoke a new constitutional convention to produce a new document more in accord with Mexican interests. In response, congress deposed President Comonfort, but Zuloaga's troops entered the capital on the 18th and dissolved congress. The following day, Comonfort accepted the Plan of Tacubaya, and released a manifesto making the case that more moderate reforms were needed under the current circumstances.

The Plan of Tacubaya did not lead to a national reconciliation, and as Comonfort realized this he began to back away from Zuloaga and the conservatives. He resigned from the presidency and even began to lead skirmishes against the Zuloaga government, but after he was abandoned by most of his loyal troops, Comonfort left the capital on January 11, 1858, with the constitutional presidency having passed to the President of the Supreme Court, Benito Juárez. The Conservative government in the capital summoned a council of representatives that elected Zuloaga as president, and the states of Mexico proclaimed their loyalties to either the conservative Zuloaga or liberal Juárez governments. The Reform War had now begun.

The War
Flight of the Liberal Government

President Juárez and his ministers fled from Mexico City to Querétaro. General Zuloaga, knowing the strategic importance of the Gulf Coast state of Veracruz, tried to win over its governor, Gutierrez Zamora, who however affirmed his support for the government of Juárez. Santiago Vidaurri and Manuel Doblado organized Liberal forces in the north and led a liberal coalition in the interior headquartered in the town of Celaya. On March 10, 1858, liberal forces under Anastasio Parrodi, governor of Jalisco, and Leandro Valle lost the Battle of Salamanca, which opened up the interior of the country to the conservatives.

Juárez was in Jalisco's capital Guadalajara at this time, when on 13-15 March part of the army there mutinied and imprisoned him, threatening his life. Liberal minister and fellow prisoner Guillermo Prieto dissuaded the hostile soldiers from shooting Juárez, an event now memorialized by a statue. As rival factions struggled to control the city, Juárez and other liberal prisoners were released on agreement after which Guadalajara was fully captured by conservatives by the end of March. Conservatives took the silver mining center of Zacatecas on 12 April. Juárez reconstituted his regime in Veracruz, embarking from the west coast port of Manzanillo, crossing Panama, and arriving in Veracruz on May 4, 1858, making it the liberal capital.

Conservative Advances
Juárez made Santos Degollado the head of the Liberal's armies, who went on to defeat upon defeat. Miramón defeated him in the Battle of Atenquique July 2. On July 24, Miramón captured Guanajuato, and San Luis Potosi was captured by the conservatives on September 12. Vidaurri was defeated at the Battle of Ahualulco on September 29. By October the conservatives were at the height of their strength.

The liberals failed to take Mexico City on the 14th of October, but Santos Degollado captured Guadalajara on the 27th of October, after a thirty days siege that left a third of the city in ruins. This victory caused consternation at the conservative capital, but Guadalajara was taken back by Márquez on December 14.

The failure of Zuloaga's government to produce a constitution actually led to a conservative revolt against him led by General Echegaray. He resigned in favor of Manuel Robles Pezuela on December 23. On December 30 a conservative junta in Mexico City elected General Miguel Miramón as president.
First Veracruz Offensive

President Miramón's most important military priority was now the capture of Veracruz, the liberals' stronghold. He left the capital on February 16, leading the troops in person along with his minister of war. Aguascalientes and Guanajuato had fallen to the liberals. Liberal troops in the West were led by Degollado and headquartered in Morelia, which now served as a liberal arsenal. The conservatives fell ill with malaria, endemic in the Gulf Coast, and abandoned the siege of Veracruz by March 29. Liberal General Degollado made another attempt on Mexico City in early April and was routed in the Battle of Tacubaya by Leonardo Márquez. Márquez captured a large amount of war materiel and gained infamy for including medics among those executed in the aftermath of the battle.

On April 6, the Juárez government was recognized by the United States during the Buchanan administration. Miramón unsuccessfully attempted to besiege Veracruz in June and July. On July 12, the liberal government nationalized the property of the Catholic church, and suppressed the monasteries and convents, the sale of which provided the liberal war effort with new funds, though not as much as had been hoped for since speculators were waiting for more stable times to make purchases.

Miramón met the liberal forces in November at which a truce was declared and a conference was held on the matter of the Constitution of 1857 and the possibility of a constituent congress. Negotiations broke down and hostilities resumed on the 12th after which Degollado was routed at the Battle of Las Vacas.

Second Veracruz Offensive
On December 14, 1859, Melchor Ocampo signed the McLane–Ocampo Treaty, which granted the United States perpetual rights to transport goods and troops across three key trade routes in Mexico and granted Americans an element of extraterritoriality. The treaty caused consternation among the conservatives and some liberals, the European press, and even members of Juarez's cabinet. The issue was rendered moot when the U.S. Senate failed to approve the treaty.

Miramón was preparing another siege of Veracruz, leaving the conservative capital of Mexico City on February 8, leading his troops in person along with his war minister, hoping to rendezvous with a small naval squadron led by the Mexican General Marin who was disembarking from Havana. The United States Navy however had orders to intercept it. Miramón arrived at Medellín on the 2nd of March, and awaited Marin's attack in order to begin the siege. The U.S. steamer Indianola had been anchored near the fortress of San Juan de Ulúa, to defend Veracruz from attack.

On March 6, Marin's squadron arrived in Veracruz, and was captured by U.S. Navy Captain Joseph R. Jarvis in the Battle of Antón Lizardo The ships were sent to New Orleans, along with the now imprisoned General Marin, depriving the conservatives of an attack force and the substantial artillery, guns, and rations that they were carrying onboard for delivery to Miramón. Miramón's effort to besiege Veracruz was abandoned on the 20th of March, and he arrived back in Mexico City on April 7.

Liberal Triumph
The conservatives also suffered defeats in the interior, losing Aguascalientes and San Luis Potosí before the end of April. Degollado was sent into the interior to lead the liberal campaign since their enemies had now exhausted their resources. He appointed José López Uraga as Quartermaster General Uraga split his troops and attempted to lure out Miramón to isolate him, but in late May Uraga then committed the strategic blunder of attempting to assault Guadalajara with Mirámon's troops behind him. The assault failed and Uraga was taken prisoner.

Miramón was routed on August 10, in Silao, which resulted in his commander Tomás Mejía being taken prisoner, and Miramón retreated to Mexico City. In response to the disaster, Miramón resigned as president to seek a vote of confidence. The conservative junta elected him president again after a two days interregnum. By the end of August, liberals were preparing for a decisive final battle. The Mexico City was cut off from the rest of the country. Guadalajara was surrounded by 17,000 liberal troops while the conservatives in the city only had 7000. The conservative commander Castillo surrendered without firing a shot and was allowed to leave the city with his troops. General Leonardo Márquez was routed on the 10th of November, attempting to reinforce General Castillo without being aware of his surrender.

Miramón on November 3 convoked a war council, including in it prominent citizens to meet the crisis and by November 5 it was resolved to fight until the end. The conservatives were not struggling with a shortage of funds and increasing defections. Nonetheless, Miramon gained a victory when he attacked the liberal headquarters of Toluca on the 9th of December, in which almost all of their forces were captured. With the tide turning to liberal victories, Juárez rejected the McLane-Ocampo Treaty in November, while the treaty had previously been rejected in the U.S. Senate May 31 and not ratified. Juárez had secured recognition from the U.S. government with the opening of negotiations with the United States, rejected outright sale of Mexican territory to the United States, and received aid from the U.S. Navy, in the end securing benefits to Mexico without actually concluding the treaty.

In early December as the tide of war had clearly turned to the liberals, Juárez signed the Law for the Liberty of Religious Worship on December 4, the final step in the liberals' program to disempower the Roman Catholic Church by allowing religious tolerance in Mexico.

General González Ortega approached Mexico City with reinforcements. The decisive battle took place on December 22, at Calpulalpan. The conservatives had 8,000 troops and the liberals 16,000. Miramon lost and retreated back towards the capital.

Another conservative war council agreed to surrender. The conservative government fled the city, and Miramón himself escaped to European exile. Márquez escaped to the mountains of Michoacan. The triumphant liberals entered the city with 25,000 troops on January 1, 1861, and Juárez entered the capital on January 11.

Foreign Powers
After Zuloaga's coup, the conservative government was recognized swiftly by Spain and France. Neither conservatives nor liberals ever had official foreign troops as part of their respective armed forces. The conservative government signed the Mon-Almonte Treaty with Spain, promising to pay the Spanish government indemnities in exchange for aid. The liberals also sought foreign support from the United States. Mexico signed the McLane-Ocampo Treaty, which would have granted the United States perpetual transit and extraterritorial rights in Mexico. This treaty was denounced by conservatives and some liberals, with Juárez countering that the territorial losses to the United States occurred under the conservatives. With the liberal victory, Juárez's government was unable to meet foreign debt obligations, some of which stemmed from the Mon-Almonte Treaty. When Juárez's government suspended payments, the pretext was used to inaugurate the Second French Intervention in Mexico.

During the Reform War as the military stalemate continued, some liberals considered the idea of foreign intervention. Brothers Miguel Lerdo de Tejada and Sebastián were liberal politicians from Veracruz and had commercial connections with the United States. Miguel Lerdo, Juárez's Minister of Finance, attempted to negotiate a loan with the United States He was reported to despair of Mexico's situation and saw some form of protection from the United States as the way forward and the way to prevent a resurgence of Spanish colonialism. Correspondence between Melchor Ocampo and Santos Degollado discussing Lerdo's attempt to negotiate a loan was captured and published by conservatives. Degollado was later to advocate mediation through the diplomatic corps in Mexico to end the conflict. Juárez flatly refused Degollado's call to resign, since Juárez saw that as turning over Mexico's future to European powers.

Aftermath

A French invasion and the establishment of the Second Mexican Empire followed almost immediately after the end of the Reform War, and key figures of the Reform War would continue to play roles during the rise and fall of the Empire.

While the main fighting in the Reform War was over by the end of 1860, guerilla conflict continued to be waged in the countryside. After the fall of the conservative government, General Leonardo Marquez remained at large, and in June, 1861, he succeeded in assassinating Melchor Ocampo. President Juarez sent the former head of his troops during the Reform War, Santos Degollado after Marquez, only for Marquez to succeed in killing Degollado as well.

Having been influenced by Mexican monarchist exiles, and using Juarez' suspension of foreign debts as a pretext, and with the American Civil War preventing the enforcement of the Monroe Doctrine, Napoleon III invaded Mexico in 1862, and sought local help in setting up a monarchical client state. Former liberal president Ignacio Comonfort, who had played such a key role in the outbreak of the Reform War, was killed in action that year, having returned to the country to fight the French, and having been given a military command. Former conservative president during the Reform War Manuel Robles Pezuela was also executed in 1862 by the Juarez government for attempting to help the French. Seeing the intervention as an opportunity to undo the Reform, conservative generals and statesmen who had played a role during the War of the Reform joined the French and a conservative assembly voted in 1863 to invite Habsburg archduke Maximilian to become Emperor of Mexico.

The Emperor however proved to be of liberal inclination, and ended up ratifying the Reform laws. Regardless, the liberal government of Benito Juárez, still resisted and fought the French and Mexican Imperial forces with the backing of the United States, whom after the end of the Civil War could now once again enforce the Monroe Doctrine. The French eventually withdrew in 1866, leading the monarchy to collapse in 1867. Former president Miguel Miramon, and conservative general Tomas Mejia would die alongside the Emperor, being executed by firing squad on June 19, 1867. Santiago Vidaurri, once Juarez' commander in the north during the Reform War had actually joined the imperialists, but he was captured and executed for his betrayal on July 8, 1867. Leonardo Marquez would once again escape, this time to Cuba, living until 1913 and publishing a defense of his role in the Empire.

See also

Cristero War
Carlist Wars

References

Further reading
Hamnett, Brian. Juárez. London: Longman 1994.
Olliff, Donathan. Reforma Mexico and the United States: A Search for Alternatives to Annexation, 1854-1861. Tuscaloosa: University of Alabama Press 1981.
Powell, T.G. "Priests and Peasants in Central Mexico: Social Conflict during La Reforma". Hispanic American Historical Review 57(1997): 296-313.
Sinkin, Richard. The Mexican Reform, 1855-1876: A Study in Liberal Nation Building''. Austin: Institute of Latin American Studies 1979.

 
Conflicts in 1857
Conflicts in 1858
Conflicts in 1859
Conflicts in 1860
Conflicts in 1861
 04
1857 in Mexico
1858 in Mexico
1859 in Mexico
1860 in Mexico
1861 in Mexico
Civil wars involving the states and peoples of North America
Second French intervention in Mexico
Wars involving Mexico
19th century in Mexico
Conservatism in Mexico
Liberalism in Mexico
Civil wars of the Industrial era